The 1998 Washington Huskies football team was an American football team that represented the University of Washington during the 1998 NCAA Division I-A football season. In its sixth and final season under head coach Jim Lambright, the team compiled a 6–5 record in the regular season, tied for fifth (4–4) in the Pacific-10 Conference, and was outscored 343 to 303.  Joe Jarzynka was selected as the team's most valuable player. Nigel Burton, Reggie Davis, Brock Huard, and Lester Towns were the team captains.

For the second straight year, the Huskies played in Honolulu on Christmas Day. They lost 25–43 to Air Force in the Oahu Bowl, resulting in the program's first non-winning season in 22 years. Five days later, Lambright was relieved of his duties as head coach by athletic director Barbara Hedges. His successor was Rick Neuheisel, the head coach at Colorado in the Big 12 Conference.

Schedule

Rankings

Roster

Season summary

at Arizona State

NFL Draft
Two Huskies were selected in the 1999 NFL Draft, which lasted seven rounds (253 selections).

References

Washington
Washington Huskies football seasons
Washington Huskies football